Gomitradougou is a rural commune in the Cercle of Diéma in the Kayes Region of western Mali. The commune includes the villages of Gomitra, Wattaye, Kouloudienguè, Missira, Bassibougou, Sébabougou, Niamakoro and N’Tallabougou. The main village (chef-lieu) is Kouloudiengué. In the 2009 census the commune had a population of 7,287.

References

Communes of Kayes Region